Cauchas cyanella is a moth of the family Adelidae or fairy longhorn moths. It was described by August Busck in 1915. It is found in North America, including Ohio.

References

Adelidae
Moths described in 1915
Moths of North America